Pseudocarum is a genus of flowering plants belonging to the family Apiaceae.

Its native range is Ethiopia to Eastern Tropical Africa, Madagascar.

Species:

Pseudocarum eminii 
Pseudocarum laxiflorum

References

Apioideae